Relative viscosity (a synonym of "viscosity ratio") is the ratio of the viscosity of a solution to the viscosity of the solvent used,
.

References 
 IUPAC Compendium of Chemical Terminology

Viscosity